Clare Gallagher is an American ultrarunner and environmental advocate. She is a past winner of both the Leadville 100 and Western State 100 races.

Early life 
Gallagher grew up in the suburbs of Denver, Colorado, where she and her family often spent weekends in the mountains. She attended Princeton University where she studied ocean health and was influenced by ethicist Peter Singer. At one point Gallagher planned to go to medical school. She graduated from Princeton in 2014.

Running career 
Gallagher ran at Princeton but lost interest in running.  She spent a couple of years in Thailand after college on a teaching fellowship. While in Thailand she won an 80-kilometer race in October 2014 having never run more than 10k previously. After her fellowship ended Gallagher moved to Boulder, Colorado and became active in the local trail running community.

Advocacy work 
Gallagher is an advocate for issues such as climate change and the environment. She is an ambassador for Winter Wildlands Alliance and is involved with Protect Our Winters (POW). She won Western States in 2019 shortly after going on a two-week mountaineering expedition in the Arctic National Wildlife Refuge to advocate for the ANWR. 

Gallagher won the Best of the Rockies—Advocate award from Elevation Outdoors Magazine in 2020 for her work as a Patagonia ambassador and POW athlete. The magazine noted that “she is a constant voice for climate action, social justice, and public lands.”

Since 2015 Gallagher is a member of Giving What We Can, a community of people who have pledged to give at least 10% of their income to effective charities.

References

Living people
American female ultramarathon runners
21st-century American women
1992 births
American female long-distance runners
American female steeplechase runners
Princeton Tigers women's track and field athletes
Princeton University alumni
Track and field athletes from Denver
Sportspeople from Denver
People from Denver